Duzangan (also Romanized as Dūzangān, Doozangan, and Dozānghān; also known as Dūzīgān and Kalāteh Dūzangun) is a village in Arabkhaneh Rural District, Shusef District, Nehbandan County, South Khorasan Province, Iran. At the 2006 census, its population was 23, in 6 families.

References 

Populated places in Nehbandan County